Get Even is a British teen thriller series that premiered on BBC iPlayer on 14 February 2020. The series was adapted by Holly Phillips from the book series Don't Get Mad by Gretchen McNeil, and focuses on a group of schoolgirls who form a group to expose bullies at their school. In August 2020, the series was acquired by Netflix and distributed internationally. In February 2022, BBC premiered a spin-off series, Rebel Cheer Squad.

Premise
Kitty Wei, Bree Deringer, Margot Rivers and Olivia Hayes form DGM (Don't Get Mad) to expose the bullies at their school. However, when one of their targets is murdered by an unknown attacker and holds a note saying "DGM" in his hand, the girls realise somebody is trying to frame them for his murder.

Cast and characters

Main
 Kim Adis as Kitty Wei, a girl who feels pressured to overachieve due to her parents' high expectations.
 Mia McKenna-Bruce as Bree Deringer, a girl who has a rich father and frequently gets into trouble at school.
 Bethany Antonia as Margot Rivers, an American girl who enjoys gaming in her free time and hasn’t got many friends at school.
 Jessica Alexander as Olivia Hayes, a popular girl who is perceived to be the typical rich girl, but actually comes from a poor background.
 Joe Flynn as Ronny Kent, a self-entitled boy who steals and posts private photos of Mika online. He is murdered by being pushed out of his bedroom window.
 Emily Carey as Mika Cavanaugh, a sheltered girl whose private photos are stolen and posted online without her consent. 
 Kit Clarke as Logan, lead actor of the drama club, who is interested in Margot.
 Jake Dunn as Christopher Beeman, the theatre director and Logan's best friend.
 Joe Ashman as Rex Cavanaugh, a childhood friend of Bree, Amber's boyfriend and Mika's brother.
 Ayumi Spyrides as Camilla, the captain of the girls football team. She was in an illegal and abusive relationship with Coach Creed, which was exposed by DGM.
 Priya Blackburn as Meera, a friend of Olivia's who secretly dislikes her.
 Joelle Bromidge as Jemima, a friend of Olivia's.
 Razan Nassar as Amber, the most popular girl in school and Olivia's best friend, Rex's girlfriend and a member of the drama club.
 Isaac Rouse as John, Bree's best friend and her closest confidant.

Recurring
 Jack Derges as Coach Richard Creed, a PE teacher who is in an illegal and abusive relationship with Camilla. He is an extremely unpleasant character, not caring who he hurts.
 Elaine Tan as Coach Evans, a PE teacher who coaches the girls' football team. She is quite arbitrary in her punishments.
 Shannon Murray as Mrs Baggott, the deputy headmistress of the school, and the mother of John.
 Chris J Gordon as Donte, Olivia's boyfriend.
 Charlie Anson as Mr Harrington, headmaster of Bannerman school.
 Dylan Brady as Ed, a student at the school and friend of Margot.
 Danny Griffin as Shane, a boy interested in Bree.
 Gerard Fletcher as Detective Bartlett, one of the detectives investigating Ronny's death.
 Natasha Atherton as Detective Misra, one of the detectives investigating Ronny's death.

Episodes

References

External links
 
 

2020 British television series debuts
2020 British television series endings
2020s British crime drama television series
2020s British mystery television series
2020s British teen television series
2020s teen drama television series
BBC crime drama television shows
British detective television series
British teen drama television series
British thriller television series
English-language television shows
Gangs in fiction
Mass media portrayals of the working class
Television series about bullying
Television series about dysfunctional families
Television series about fictional musicians
Television series about sisters
Television series about teenagers